Nelson Bay orthoreovirus, often called Nelson Bay virus (NBV) is a novel double-stranded RNA orthoreovirus species first isolated from a flying fox (Pteropus poliocephalus) near Nelson Bay in New South Wales, Australia.

Virology

Genome

The NBV has a morphology similar to other orthoreoviruses, but has a much more rapid cytopathic effect.

See also
 Bat virome
 Double-stranded RNA viruses
 Oncolytic virus
 Orphan virus
 Xi River virus

References

External links
 MicrobiologyBytes—Reoviruses
 Viralzone: Orthoreovirus

Orthoreoviruses
Bat virome